Southern Pacific #9 is a  oil-fired narrow gauge steam locomotive, built by the Baldwin Locomotive Works in November 1909.

It was originally built for the Nevada–California–Oregon Railway and was sold to Southern Pacific in the late 1920s.  The engine worked the rest of its career on the SP narrow gauge.  The locomotive, along with sisters #8 and #18, were nicknamed "The Desert Princess" for riding along the western and eastern deserts of Nevada and California.

In 1954, there was a plan to purchase a new narrow gauge diesel from GE as SP #1, to replace numbers #9, #8 and #18. Whilst #8 and #18 were sold off, #9 was kept on as a standby locomotive to support diesel locomotive #1 in case of a breakdown.

The engine and the two others, #8 and #18, survived into preservation. Southern Pacific #9 is now on display at the Laws Railroad Museum in Laws, California.

The engine was also used in the 1948 film 3 Godfathers, starring John Wayne, Pedro Armendáriz, and Harry Carey Jr.; as well as cameoing the 1954 - 1957 TV western series Annie Oakley, starring Gail Davis.

See also
 Southern Pacific 8
 Southern Pacific 18

References

External links
 Laws Railroad Museum

0009
4-6-0 locomotives
Baldwin locomotives
3 ft gauge locomotives
Railway locomotives introduced in 1909
Preserved steam locomotives of California